Bartolomeo Bimbi (15 May 1648 – 1729) was a Florentine painter of still lifes, commissioned by his patrons including Cosimo III, Grand Duke of Tuscany to paint large canvases of flora and fauna for the Medici Villa dell'Ambrogiana and della Topaia, now conserved in the Pitti Palace and the Museo Botanico dell'Universita.

Life and Work
Son of Nicolò, he was born in Settignano on May 15, 1648; in about 1661 he entered the workshop of Lorenzo Lippi, where he remained until the death of the master (1665); then he joined Onorio Marinari as his apprentice. After a trip to Rome with Cardinal Leopoldo de' Medici, he began working for the Florentine court and aristocracy. Although his training made him suitable for figure painting, Bimbi is known almost exclusively for his activity as a painter of still lifes and portraits.

Bimbi died in Florence on 14 January 1729.

He partly was following the tradition of Jacopo Ligozzi in documenting the botanical collections of the Medici. He was a pupil of Lorenzo Lippi and Onorio Marinari. Others claim he was a pupil of Angelo Gori.

References

National Gallery Art exhibition titled The Flowering of Florence; Botanical art for the Medici

Gallery

Painters from Florence
Italian still life painters
Botanical illustrators
1648 births
1729 deaths